is a Japanese politician of the Liberal Democratic Party (LDP), a member of the House of Representatives in the Diet (national legislature). A native of Osaka, Osaka, he attended Waseda University as a graduate student. He was elected to the first of his three terms in the city assembly of Osaka in 1975. After running unsuccessfully for the House of Representatives in 1986 as an independent, he ran again in 1990 as a member of the LDP and was elected for the first time.

References

External links
 Official website in Japanese.

Living people
1944 births
People from Osaka
Liberal Democratic Party (Japan) politicians
Members of the House of Representatives (Japan)
Japanese municipal councilors
Politicians from Osaka Prefecture
People from Yokohama
Waseda University alumni
21st-century Japanese politicians